Woodchipping is the act and industry of chipping wood for pulp. Timber is converted to woodchips and sold, primarily, for  paper manufacture. In Australia, woodchips are produced by clearcutting or thinning of native forests or plantations. In other parts of the world, forestry practices such as short rotation coppice are the usual methods adopted.

Uses of wood chips includes the manufacture of particle board (or "chip board") and other engineered woods, mulch and fuel.

Sources and process

Historically, the primary sources of wood chips in Australia have been the extensive Eucalyptus hardwood forests found throughout temperate areas of the country. In more recent times, a significant proportion comes from managed hardwood and softwood plantations.

During the late 1960s and 1970s, the high demand for paper and the relatively low cost and availability of the native forests made the establishment of a woodchipping industry a viable proposition. Conversely, the establishment of a woodchipping industry made it economically feasible to clearfell areas of mixed or substandard forest that could not otherwise have been felled. Clearfelling is a controversial forest practice in Australia, and opponents argue that the woodchipping industry is culpable for its continuation.

Woodchips are converted into a fibre that can be made into various grades of paper or rayon for the textile industry.  Most processing and value adding takes place outside of Australia.
The Australian economy benefits directly from a low-cost and high-volume export commodity.

Usage 

Wood chips, as a byproduct of the timber industry, have been used in many ways for centuries, for example as a material for the production of wallpaper or as a disposable floor covering in butchers shop or drinking houses. Wood pulp is the primary market for the woodchipping industry in Australia.

The practice, known as woodchipping, was to make use of most of the woody material in a tree to produce wood chips.  This was then converted into paper, hardwood pulp is mainly used for printing paper and softwood pulp is added for good quality. An energy-intensive process, it also involved the use of bleaches and other toxic chemicals.  This stage of the process, known as Kraft pulping, was primarily performed in Japan and elsewhere. High demand for paper products had purpose-built bulk carriers increase the export of woodchips from Australia to Japan.

The separation of the chipping stage and the pulping and paper mills required the supply of energy usually sourced from byproducts of the process. Additional energy expenditure is found in the shipping of raw materials and export of the finished product.

Criticism and environmental opposition 
The introduction of the wood chip industry to Western Australia in the 1960s initially attracted less opposition than it did in the eastern states. At first it was seen as an opportunity for the economic development of the south west; it was not until the 1970s that an environmental movement against it began to emerge. The volatility of the issue became apparent in 1976 when two activists carried out the Bunbury woodchip bombing, a failed attempt to disable woodchip exporting facilities for 18 months.

See also

Land clearing in Australia
Logging
Woodchipper

Woodchip mill companies and locations
Eden, New South Wales
North Shore, Victoria
Longreach, Tasmania
Bell Bay, Tasmania
Hampshire, Tasmania
Gunns
W.A. Chip & Pulp Co
Wesley Vale pulp mill

Woodchip critics and opponents
Australian Greens
Australian Conservation Foundation
Campaign to Save Native Forests
Conservation Council of Western Australia
Great Walk Networking
Liberals for Forests
South West Forests Defence Foundation
Western Australian Forests Alliance

Notes

References

Further reading
 Dargavel, John (1995) Fashioning Australia's forests, Oxford. Oxford University Press.
 Lines, William J. (1998) A long walk in the Australian bush, Sydney, University of New South Wales Press.
 Mcdonald, Jan (1975) The Australian woodchip industry : a bibliography  Canberra : Subject Reference Section, Parliamentary Library Legislative Service, 1975  "This bibliography has been compiled in connection with the inquiry into the Australian woodchip industry by the Senate Select Committee on Social Environment"
 Routley, R. and V. (1973) The Fight for the Forests: The Takeover of Australian Forests for Pines, Wood Chips and Intensive Forestry, Research School of Social Sciences, ANU, Canberra.
 Tamaki, Mitsuzo. (1999) Green business alliance : The case of a Japanese/Australian joint forest plantation project. Asia Pacific journal of economics & business, Dec. 1999, p. 76-96
 Thompson, Herb and Tracy, Julie.(1995)  Woodchipping in Western Australia : timber workers vs. conservationists. Perth, W.A. : Murdoch University. . Working paper (Murdoch University. Dept. of Economics); no. 135..
 Walter, Terry (1976)  “Some Cost-benefit Aspects of Wood-Chipping in Western Australia”, Economic Activity, 56- 65.

External links
 History of woodchipping
 New Bush Telegraph report
 Gunns Mill pro- argument from NAFI
 Chipstop - lobby group

Environmental issues with forests
History of Western Australia
Environmental issues in Australia
Forestry in Australia
Timber industry in Western Australia